Três Rios is a municipality located in the Brazilian state of Rio de Janeiro. The current mayor of Três Rios is Joacir Barbaglio Pereira (known as Joa) of the Liberal Party, elected in 2020 to a four-year term.

The name Três Rios, meaning "three rivers" in Portuguese, is a reference to the three important rivers in the area: the Paraíba do Sul, the Piabanha, and the Paraibuna. The city itself is located on the Paraíba, and the three rivers meet downstream, to the east. The name "Esquina do Brasil" was inspired by the words of former president Juscelino Kubitschek, referring to the major highways that pass through. Três Rios 

Três Rios hosts a campus of the Federal Rural University of Rio de Janeiro (UFRRJ), called the Instituto Três Rios, which offers four undergraduate programs.

Sports
There are three sport clubs in the city. América, Entrerriense and Três Rios Futebol Clube. América's football section is currently closed, but the club still disputes basketball competitions. Entrerriense and Três Rios FC's football sections are currently active. Três Rios is currently disputing Campeonato Carioca Third Level.

References

External links 

 Prefeitura (mayor and city hall) of Três Rios
 Câmara Municipal (city council) of Três Rios
 Três Rios campus of the Federal Rural University of Rio de Janeiro

Municipalities in Rio de Janeiro (state)